Iqra University, is a Private University primarily with its main campus located in Defence Area of Karachi, Pakistan. It has additional campuses in other parts of the city, in Islamabad and Quetta. Iqra University was ranked as the number 1 business school in Pakistan by the Higher Education Commission of Pakistan in the rankings announced in 2016. Iqra University also collaborates with universities of international repute for student exchange program.

History 
Chartered by the Government of Sindh, Iqra university was founded as Asian Management Institute (AMI) in1998, by a group of Karachi-based industrialists. Later, the university name was updated to "Iqra University" after being granted the status of university by HEC in 2002. In 2015, Iqra University inaugurated its North Campus (named Iqra University North Campus).

It was ranked in the top three business higher education institutions by HEC in 2015. Also, the university has the largest research publication output of other higher learning institutions of the country.

University management 
The university was founded by Pakistani businessman Hunaid Lakhani, founding chancellor and Chairman, who served as the president of Pakistan Bait-ul-Maal Sindh.

Co-founder: Mrs. Erum Asad as

Vice Chancellor / President: Prof. Dr. Wasim Qazi

Registrar: Dr. Mirza Amin ul Haq

Campuses

Karachi

 Main Campus - Defence view, Shaheed-e-Millat Road
 Gulshan Campus -  Abid Town, Block-2, Gulshan-e-Iqbal
 Gulshan Campus 2 - block 7
 Bahria Town Campus - Bahria town 
 North Campus - Sector 7-B/1, North Karachi, opposite Muhammad Shah Graveyard.
 Malir Campus - Malir Halt, Airport road

Islamabad

 5 Khayaban-e-Johar, Sector H-9/1 H 9/1 H-9

Islamabad – Chak Shahzad 

 Park link Rd, Islamabad

Programs offered 
The university offers undergraduate, postgraduate, and doctoral studies programmes in engineering, film studies, management sciences, administration, and related social and natural sciences disciplines. University also offers associate degrees in different disciplines.

Academics profile 
University offers degrees in different departments.

Business Administration

Associate Degrees 

 Digital Marketing
 Entrepreneurship
 IIslamic Banking & Finance
 Tourism & Hospitality Management
 Accounting & Finance
 Commerce
 Sales & Marketing

Undergraduate programs 

 Bachelor of Business Administration
 BS Entrepreneurship
 BS Accounting & Finance
 BS Economics & Finance
 BS Islamic Banking & Finance
 BS Media Studies

Graduate programs 

 Masters in Business Administration
 Master of Philosophy

Doctor of Philosophy 

 Ph.D. in Business Administration

Computer Science

Associate Degrees 

 Artificial Intelligence
 Computer Networking
 Cyber Security
 Database Management System

Undergraduate programs 

 BS (Computer Sciences)
 Bs (Software Engineering)

Graduate programs 

 MS (Computer Science)

Doctor of Philosophy 

 Ph.D. (Computer Science)

Engineering

Undergraduate programs 

 BE Electrical
 BE Electronics
 BE Software Engineering

Health Sciences

Associate Degrees 

 Counselling Psychology

Diploma programs 

 Certificated Nursing Assistant
 Post RN BSN

Undergraduate programs 

 Doctor of Pharmacy
 Doctor of Physical Therapy
 BS Human Nutrition & dietetics
 BS Psychology
 BS Nursing

Education

Associate Degrees 

 Education
 English Language Teaching

Undergraduate programs 

 Bachelors of Education
 Bachelors of Science in English

Graduate programs 

 Masters of Philosophy in Education
 Masters of Philosophy in English

Doctor of Philosophy 

 Ph.D. in Education

Fashion & Textile 

 BFD (HONS)
 BTD (HONS)
 BS FMM (HONS)
 M-DMM

Media Studies

Undergraduate programs 

 Bachelors in Media Studies (Film & TV)
 Bachelors in Media Studies (Animation)
 Bachelors in Media Studies (Advertising)

Graduate programs 

 Masters in Media Sciences (Film & TV)
 Masters in Media Sciences (Advertising)

Notable alumni 
Babar Jamal - Business Head – Zambia at Burque Corporation Pvt. Ltd

Zehra Ismail - Manager Supply Chain at K-Electric

Muhammad Ahmed - Business Manager (International) at English Biscuit Manufacturers (Pvt) Ltd

Haris Mahmood - Manager Training & Development at M&P Express Logistics (Private) Limited

Subayyal Ahmed Khan - Deputy Mangar HR at Dollar Industries Pvt. Limited (Stationery Manufacturers)

Ali Pesnani - Senior Executive Vice President & Group Head Retail Banking at JS Bank Ltd

Dr. Ali Kashan Malick - Deputy General Manager EMS Operations at Aman Foundation

Information Resource Center 
The Information Resource Centre (IRC) at Iqra University has around 80000 volumes on various themes, including all curriculum topics, professional reading material, and general reading material. One of the greatest sources of secondary data is the Information Resource Centre, which keeps an up-to-date database of government publications related to the curriculum.

IRC facilities 

 Book bank
 Newspapers articles
 E-Books
 Movies 
 Iqra news & views

Rankings
Iqra University was ranked at no.01 in Business as per Higher Education Commission of Pakistan (HEC) rankings 2012. According to the HEC 2015 ranking, Iqra University was in the first position in Pakistan in the Business category.

Latest figures from ISI Thompson shown that IQRA University has published more research papers than the other top business schools of Pakistan. In 2011, Iqra University was ranked as the no. 1 among all private institutions.

In a meeting held on July 13, 2012, NCEAC-HEC (National Computing Education Accreditation Council of Higher Education Commission) has granted accreditation to the Computer Science Program of Iqra University for the batches graduating in the academic years 2008–12, 2009–13 and 2010–14. NCEAC-HEC also evaluated the quality standard of the said program and placed it into the top most ranking (W-Category).

References

External links 
Iqra University - Main Campus Karachi
Iqra University - Gulshan Campus
Iqra University - North Campus
Iqra University - Islamabad Campus

Universities and colleges in Karachi
Private universities and colleges in Sindh
Educational institutions established in 1998
1998 establishments in Pakistan